Born to Be a Star is a greatest hits album by Taiwanese singer Jolin Tsai. It was released on November 12, 2004, by Universal and D Sound. It contains 29 songs and 15 music videos previously released by Universal.

Background and release 
In March 1999, Tsai signed a recording contract with Universal, through which she later released four studio albums—1019 (1999), Don't Stop (2000), Show Your Love (2000), and Lucky Number (2001), the four albums have sold more than 450,000, 500,000, 280,000, and 150,000 copies in Taiwan, respectively. On November 6, 2001, Universal released for Tsai the greatest hits album, Together. On April 2, 2002, Universal released for Tsai the remix album, Dance Collection. On July 23, 2002, Tsai signed a recording contract with Sony. On May 14, 2003, Universal released for Tsai the greatest hits album, The Age of Innocence.

On November 12, 2004, Universal released for Tsai the greatest hits album titled Born to Be a Star. It contains 29 songs and 15 music videos previously released during the Universal period.

Critical reception 
Tencent Entertainment's Shuwa commented: "Magic and Castle made Jolin Tsai become one of the best selling singers in Taiwan. At the end of 2004, Universal wasted no time in releasing a new greatest hits album of 29 old works. But this time, almost all the Jolin Tsai's music videos released during the Universal period were included in the DVD, which heated up the market again."

Track listing

Release history

References 

2004 greatest hits albums
Jolin Tsai compilation albums
Universal Music Taiwan compilation albums